Louisa Moritz (born Luisa Cira Castro Netto; September 25, 1936 – January 4, 2019) was a Cuban-American actress and lawyer. After arriving in New York from Cuba, she became a film and television actress, then earned a law degree. She is best known for her roles in One Flew Over the Cuckoo’s Nest and the television show Love, American Style.

Early life
Moritz was born in Havana, where she worked as an accountant. Owing to the political upheaval of the late 1950s she left Cuba and moved to New York, arriving on July 15, 1960, aged 23. She later shaved 10 years off her true age, adopting 1946 as her  year of birth. To avoid association with Fidel Castro, to whom she was distantly related, she adopted the last name Moritz after seeing the Hotel St. Moritz in New York City.

Professional life
Unable to speak English when she first moved to the United States in 1960, Moritz started acting in commercials in the 1960s. Her first film was The Man from O.R.G.Y. in 1970. In 1982, Moritz had a role in The Last American Virgin as Carmela. Moritz generally played ditzy blondes, appearing in numerous films, of which the best known was One Flew Over the Cuckoo's Nest in 1975 as the prostitute Rose, and in TV shows, including Happy Days, M*A*S*H, and Love, American Style, where she was a regular.

Moritz later studied law at the University of West Los Angeles and Abraham Lincoln University. She was admitted to the California Bar in 2004. According to her publicist, she was at the top of her class and won the American Jurisprudence Bancroft Whitney Prize for Contracts.

On June 25, 2015, Moritz was suspended from the State Bar of California. On October 1, 2017, she was disbarred for failure to comply with terms set out in her previous disciplinary actions and to respond to the California Bar.

Moritz also invested in real estate, owning a hotel in Beverly Hills that she renamed the Beverly Hills St. Moritz, and produced self-defense programs for TV.

Death
After being injured in a fall during a visit to Washington, D.C., Moritz died in a hospital in Los Angeles, aged 82, on January 4, 2019, of natural causes.

Accusations against Bill Cosby

In November 2014, Moritz became one of the first women to accuse Bill Cosby, claiming Cosby sexually assaulted her in the green room of The Tonight Show in 1971. After Cosby accused her of lying, she sued him for defamation; her lawyer planned to continue the lawsuit after her death.

Selected filmography

Film

 Assignment: Female (1966) as Miss Mousie
 The Man from O.R.G.Y. (1970) as Gina Moretti
 The Nine Lives of Fritz the Cat (1974) as Chita (Juan's sister) (voice)
 La disputa (1974)
 Fore Play (1975) as Lt. Sylvia Arliss
 Death Race 2000 (1975) as Myra
 One Flew Over the Cuckoo's Nest (1975) as Rose
 Six Pack Annie (1975) as Flora
 Cannonball (1976) as Louisa
 The Happy Hooker Goes to Washington (1977) as Natalie Nussbaum
 Charge of the Model T's (1977) as Hilda
 Loose Shoes (1978) as Margie, Duddy's Date
 Up in Smoke (1978) as Officer Gloria Whitey
 The North Avenue Irregulars (1979) as Mrs. Gossin
 Cuba (1979) as Miss Wonderly
 New Year's Evil (1980) as Sally
 Under the Rainbow (1981) as Telephone Operator
 True Confessions (1981) as Whore
 Lunch Wagon (1981) as Sunshine
 The Last American Virgin (1982) as Carmela
 Chained Heat (1983) as Bubbles
 Euer Weg führt durch die Hölle (1984) as Laura McCashin
 Hot Chili (1985) as Chi Chi
 Galaxis (1995) as Bar Lady at Sharkey's
 The Independent (2000) as Sally / Receptionist (final film role)

Television

 The Leslie Uggams Show, episode dated 12 October 1969 as French Wife
 The Joe Namath Show, episode dated 21 October 1969 as Mail Girl
 Love, American Style, segments of various episodes in 1971–72 as Candy Lee (segment "Love and the Alibi") / Dawn (segment "Love and the Vacation") / Dawn (segment "Love and the Detective")
 Ironside, episode "Man Named Arno" in 1972 as Bonnie
 Happy Days,  episode "Richie's Cup Runneth Over" in 1974 as Verna LaVerne
 Happy Anniversary and Goodbye (1974 TV movie) as Terry
 M*A*S*H, episode "Bombed" in 1975 as Nurse Sanchez
 Match Game, panelist in 1974–75
 One Day at a Time, episode "How to Succeed Without Trying" in 1976 as Receptionist
 Chico and the Man, episode "Chico Packs His Bags" in 1976 as Lorraine
 The Rockford Files, episode "The Dog and Pony Show" in 1977 as Helen
 The Rockford Files, episode "A Good Clean Bust with Sequel Rights" in 1978 as Debbi
 The Incredible Hulk, episode "Sideshow" in 1980 as Beth
 The Associates, episode "The Censors" in 1980 as Vera #1
 Enos,  episode "The Head Hunter" in 1981
 The Cartier Affair (1984 TV movie) as Wife of Fish Market/Restaurant Owner

References

External links

 
 

1936 births
2019 deaths
California lawyers
Cuban emigrants to the United States
Disbarred American lawyers
American film actresses
American television actresses
American entertainers of Cuban descent
20th-century American actresses
21st-century American actresses
Actresses from New York City
Woodbury University alumni
20th-century American lawyers